Dylan Trees was a British-American psychedelic pop band who play frequently around Los Angeles, California. They released their first recording, Charlie Horse EP, in 2008, followed up by Three Times of the Day EP in 2012. Both were recorded at Mother West in New York City and Atomix Studios in Los Angeles.

Dylan Trees disbanded in October, 2012.

Members 
 Jeremy Simon  – vocals and guitar
 Monica Olive  – vocals, synth and percussion
 Krissy Barker  – piano, vocals, saw and flute
 Brian Griffith  – bass
 Casey Wojtalewicz  – drums and vocals

Discography

Extended plays
  Charlie Horse EP (2008) produced by Charles Newman at Mother West
  Three Time of the Day EP (2012) produced by Charles Newman at Mother West

Compilations
  Beat LA (2011) song "Topanga" by Kathy Smith

References

External links 
 

Alternative rock groups from California
Indie rock musical groups from California
Musical groups from Los Angeles
Psychedelic rock music groups from California